Ayuba is an African name that may refer to
Given name
Ayuba Suleiman Diallo (1701—1773), victim of the Atlantic slave trade from Senegal

Surname
Abubakar Tanko Ayuba, Nigerian politician 
Adewale Ayuba (born 1966), Nigerian singer 
Yosif Ayuba (born 1990), Swedish footballer of Beninese descent